Moscow Ring Railway may refer to:

 Moscow Central Circle
 Little Ring of the Moscow Railway
 Greater Ring of the Moscow Railway